Ndorobo or Dorobo may refer to:

Languages spoken by "Dorobo peoples" of Kenya and Tanzania
 Aasáx language
 Aramanik language
 Kisankasa language
 Mediak language
 Mosiro language
 Omaio language
 Serengeti-Dorobo language

Other languages
 Dorobo, a spurious language purportedly belonging to the Kuliak languages